The Brønnøy dialect ( or Sørvest-helgelandsk) is a dialect of Norwegian used in Brønnøy.

Phonology

Tonemes
Unlike most Norwegian dialects, the Brønnøy dialect lacks tonal accents.

References

Bibliography

 

Culture in Nordland
Norwegian dialects
City colloquials